Empress Xiaoyixiang (died 1646), of the Zeng clan, was a Chinese empress consort of the Southern Ming, empress to the Longwu Emperor.

Notes

|-

Southern Ming empresses
1646 deaths
Year of birth unknown
17th-century Chinese women
17th-century Chinese people